D57 may refer to:

 D57 (Croatia), a state road in Croatia
 New South Wales D57 class locomotive, a class of locomotive operated by the New South Wales Government Railways, Australia
 HMS Fidelity (D57)